Willow Vale or Willowvale may refer to:

 Willow Vale, New South Wales (Kiama), Australia
 Willow Vale, New South Wales (Wingecarribee), Australia
 Willow Vale, Queensland, Australia
 Willow Vale Township, Bottineau County, North Dakota, United States
 Willowvale, Queensland, Australia
 Willowvale, South Africa
 Willowvale, Harare, Zimbabwe

See also
 Willowdale (disambiguation)